San Regolo is a Romanesque-style, Roman Catholic church, located in the center of the town of Vagli Sotto in the province of Lucca, Tuscany, Italy.

History
Documents from 1154, cite a church of Santa Maria in Vagli Sotto, which may correspond to this church. The dedication to San Regolo was derived when a nearby church was dedicated to St Augustine. The building dates to the 12th to 13th centuries, with later enlargements and refurbishments. During a pastoral visit in 1568, the church was dedicated to Santa Maria e San Regolo. The construction is rustic, with incomplete lines of alternating white and dark stone in the facade and flanks. The portal with a rounded marble arch, is minimally decorated, and preceded by a circular staircase. The superior portion of the facade has a round oculus.  

The interior houses a 15th-century holy water font. It also contains two wooden statues: a 13th-14th century Madonna and child and a 14th-century crucifix attributed to the Maestro del Crocifisso di Camaiore.

References

Romanesque architecture in Lucca
Churches in the province of Lucca
12th-century Roman Catholic church buildings in Italy